Rear Admiral John Denison DSO (1853 – March 6, 1939) was a Canadian member of the Royal Navy.

His great-grandfather, grandfather, father, and five brothers served as army officers, but Denison joined the Navy in 1867, as a midshipman.  From 1893 to 1896 he commanded the royal yacht .  He was described as the first Canadian to command a fleet.

He served as naval aide de camp to King Edward VII from 1905 to 1906.

He retired in 1909, as a Rear Admiral.

His son, Bertram Denison, followed him into the Royal Navy, serving as a midshipman during the Boer War.  He would later transfer to the Army.  He was wounded in the head, and left for dead, leading his men in an attack, during the first battle of World War I.

Denison died in Alverstock, near Portsmouth, England on March 9, 1939.

References

1853 births
Date of birth missing
1939 deaths
Canadian Companions of the Distinguished Service Order
Royal Navy rear admirals
John
Companions of the Distinguished Service Order